AAFL may refer to:

 All American Football League, a professional league of American football
 Auckland Australian Football League, an Australian rules football competition in Auckland, New Zealand